The Canadian Pacing Derby is a race for three-year-old Standardbred Free For All pacers run at a distance of one mile at Woodbine Mohawk Park in Campbellville, Ontario.

Historical race events
The Canadian Pacing Derby was first run on August 12, 1936 at Fountain Park Racetrack in New Hamburg, Ontario operated by the New Hamburg Turf Club. For 1949 only, the race was renamed the Canadian Pacing And Trotting Derby with trotting horses allowed to compete against pacers. The lone trotter entered finished far back. The Derby was suspended after the 1957 running and was not revived until 1965 when it was raced as a 1-3/16 mile event at Greenwood Raceway in Toronto. The following year the race returned to the standard distance of a mile.

Race locations
Fountain Park: 1936-1957
Greenwood Raceway: 1965-1993
Woodbine Racetrack: 1994-2004
Woodbine Mohawk Park: since 2005

Records
 Most wins by a horse
 4 – The Count B (1944, 1945, 1947, 1948)

Most wins by an owner
5 – James W. Brown (1941, 1944, 1945, 1947, 1948)

 Most wins by a driver
 4 – John Campbell (1996, 1998, 2002, 2003)

 Most wins by a trainer
 6 – William Robinson (1978, 1986, 1994, 1995, 1999, 2003)

 Most wins by an owner
 5 – James W. Brown (1941, 1944, 1945, 1947, 1948)

Stakes records
 At Fountain Park
 2:04 1/5 – Blue Again (1946)

 At Greenwood
 1:51 1/5 – Staying Together (1993)

 At Woodbine
 1:48 3/5 – Casimir Camotion (2004)

 At Mohawk
 1:46 4/5 – Bulldog Hanover (2022)

Canadian Pacing Derby winners

† run at a distance of 1-3/16 miles.

References

Recurring sporting events established in 1936
Harness races in Canada
1936 establishments in Ontario
Mohawk Racetrack